Fire United Christian Football Club was a football club based in Lewisham, London, England. They played at the Terence McMillan Stadium in Plaistow.

History
The club was founded in 2012 as Fire United Christian by Gustavo Ferreira, and is owned by the Yehoshua Ministries, a Christian group of which Ferreira is the founder. The club has a Christian ethos, with the club's motto being "Worthy are you, our Lord and God, to receive glory and honor and power", which appears on the club badge. The club mainly contains players from the Brazilian community in London. They joined Division One Central & East of the Middlesex County League for the 2012–13 season. In 2013–14 the club were runners-up in the division. However, they finished bottom of the table the following season, and were inactive in 2015–16. After returning to Division One Central & East for the 2016–17 season, they won the Jim Rogers President's Division One Cup in 2017–18. The club subsequently successfully applied to join the new Division One South of the Eastern Counties League. The 2018–19 season saw the club enter the FA Vase for the first time. They resigned from the Eastern Counties League shortly before the start of the 2020–21 season.

Ground
The club initially played at the Westway Sports Centre in Ladbroke Grove, before moving to the New River Stadium in Wood Green prior to the 2014–15 season. In 2018 they relocated to the Terence McMillan Stadium in Plaistow. The Terence McMillan Stadium has one stand with seats for 192 spectators. The stadium is named after the first Mayor of Newham. The club shared the ground with Lopes Tavares.

Honours
Middlesex County League
Jim Rogers President's Division One Cup winners (1) 2017–18

Records
Highest league position: 19th in Eastern Counties League Division One South 2018–19
Best FA Vase performance: First qualifying round 2018–19, 2019–20

References

External links
Official site

Association football clubs established in 2012
Association football clubs disestablished in 2021
Defunct football clubs in London
Football clubs in England
Football clubs in London
Middlesex County Football League
Eastern Counties Football League
2012 establishments in England
2021 disestablishments in England
Diaspora sports clubs in the United Kingdom
Sport in the London Borough of Newham